Mia Mia is a locality of  Central Victoria, Australia,  north of Melbourne and  south of Bendigo.  It is largely an area of broadacre farms raising cattle and sheep.  It is a part of the Heathcote wine region Wine District and a number of vineyards have been established in the area, most notably producing Shiraz grapes. Its local government areas are the City of Greater Bendigo and Shire of Mitchell, Mia Mia is part of the Federal Electorates of Bendigo and McEwen and it is in the state electorate of Euroa. In 2011, it had a population of 265.

History

The Post Office opened on 22 November 1861, closing in 1970.

Mia Mia is notable for being the home of John Duigan and brother Reginald Duigan who built and flew the first Australian made aeroplane in 1910 on their property named Spring Plains.  A monument to their endeavours was constructed out of local bluestone and unveiled in 1960.

Mia Mia’s  western boundary is on the Campaspe River which is crossed by an iron bridge near Redesdale that is unusual in design and is quite memorable for those passing through.

Gold Escort Robbery

Mia Mia was the location of a violent gold escort robbery in 1853. A gang of at least six robbers and possibly as large as twelve bailed up a gold escort on the way to Kyneton. The robbers opened fire on the six escorters in which four were wounded. The other two fled to Heathcote to raise the alarm. When help arrived they found that the robbers and the gold was gone. Later John Francis gave crown evidence against the others and three of the villains were hanged.

Burke and Wills

The Burke and Wills expedition passed through Mia Mia in 1860 on their journey across Australia from Melbourne to the Gulf of Carpentaria. They arrived on Saturday, 25 August 1860 and made Camp VI, (their sixth camp since leaving Melbourne). Sunday was taken as a rest day when the men caught up on chores and they left on Monday morning. The road from Lancefield to Mia Mia via Ben Loch and the Great Dividing Range is now called 'The Burke and Wills Track'. In 2010 the town erected a small monument to the expedition to mark the sesquicentenary of their visit.

See also 
 List of reduplicated Australian place names

References

External links

 Burke & Wills Web A comprehensive website containing many of the historical documents relating to the Burke & Wills Expedition.
 The Burke & Wills Historical Society The Burke & Wills Historical Society.

Towns in Victoria (Australia)
Shire of Mitchell
Bendigo
Suburbs of Bendigo